Jens Aage Als-Nielsen (born 21 January 1937) is a Danish physicist.

He took the dr.philos. degree in 1965, was employed at Risø National Laboratory from 1961 to 1995 and was a professor at the University of Copenhagen from 1995 to 2007. He was a co-creator of the European Synchrotron Radiation Facility.

Als-Nielsen received the Hewlett-Packard Award in 1985 and the Velux Foundation honorary award in 2011. He was a fellow of the Norwegian Academy of Science and Letters from 1996.

References

1937 births
Living people
Danish physicists
Academic staff of the University of Copenhagen
Members of the Norwegian Academy of Science and Letters